Jordan Thompson was the defending champion but chose not to defend his title.

Mathias Bourgue won the title after defeating Maximilian Marterer 6–3, 7–6(7–3) in the final.

Seeds

Draw

Finals

Top half

Bottom half

References
Main Draw
Qualifying Draw

Challenger La Manche - Singles